Hooperman is an American comedy-drama television series which aired on ABC from September 23, 1987, to July 19, 1989. The show centered on the professional and personal life of San Francisco police Inspector Harry Hooperman, played by John Ritter. The series was created by Steven Bochco and Terry Louise Fisher, who were the team responsible for creating L.A. Law. Though not the first comedy drama, Hooperman was considered the vanguard of a new television genre when it premiered, and critics coined the term "dramedy" to describe it.

Synopsis
Ritter plays San Francisco police Inspector Harry Hooperman. In the first episode, Hooperman inherits the rundown apartment building he lives in when his elderly landlady is killed in a robbery. He also inherits her temperamental pet Jack Russell terrier named Bijoux. Due to the demands of his job as a police officer, he hires Susan Smith (played by Debrah Farentino) to be the building manager, and the pair become romantically involved throughout the first season.

Also starring on the show was Alix Elias as the cheerful and bubbly police dispatcher, Betty Bushkin; Barbara Bosson was Hooperman's divorced superior, Capt. Celeste "C.Z." Stern; Felton Perry as Harry's partner, Inspector Clarence McNeil; Clarence Felder as redneck inspector Boris "Bobo" Pritzger; Joseph Gian as Rick Silardi, a gay cop, and Sydney Walsh as officer Maureen "Mo" DeMott, his patrol partner who was intent on "saving" him from being gay by making unwanted passes.  Dan Lauria played Celeste's former husband, Lou Stern.

The theme music was composed by Mike Post.

Guest stars in the series' 42-episode run included: Don Cheadle, Kim Delaney, Dennis Dugan, Norman Fell (who worked with Ritter on The Stone Killer and Three's Company), Miguel Ferrer, Jack Gilford, Mark Hamill, Joanna Kerns (who did a guest spot on Three's Company), Richard Kind, Dan Lauria, Jane Leeves, Lorna Luft, David Paymer, Barbara Rush, and Shannon Tweed.

Except for a brief syndicated run on the FX Network in the mid 1990s, and the pilot rebroadcast on TV Land in 2003 following Ritter's death, the series has not aired since then.

Episodes

Season 1 (1987–88)

Season 2 (1988–89)

Home media
On January 24, 2017, Olive Films released both seasons on DVD in Region 1.

Awards and nominations
The pilot episode won the 1988 Emmy Award for Outstanding Directing in a Comedy Series.

References

External links

1987 American television series debuts
1989 American television series endings
1980s American comedy-drama television series
1980s American crime drama television series
1980s American LGBT-related comedy television series
1980s American LGBT-related drama television series
American Broadcasting Company original programming
1980s American police comedy television series
English-language television shows
Television series by 20th Century Fox Television
Television shows set in San Francisco
Television series created by Steven Bochco